Reuben Colley (born 1976) is a British representational painter primarily recognised for his "gritty" city-scapes and parkland scenes depicting his home town of Birmingham, England. His work is included in the collection of the Birmingham Museum and Art Gallery and private collections both nationally and internationally.

Life
Colley studied at Bournville Art College, Birmingham, and in 1995, he enrolled at The University of Wolverhampton, where he gained a BA Honours in Fine Art, specialising in painting.

Through his work he has supported charitable causes including Freedom from Torture and Birmingham Children's Hospital.

After founding a commercial gallery (Reuben Colley Fine Arts) in the Moseley district of Birmingham in 2010, the gallery relocated to Birmingham's city centre on Colmore Row in 2015.

Colley has said: "I don't paint a particular subject, I try to depict an atmosphere". He's explained his process, saying:

Awards

 2002 Best Up and Coming Published Artist. Fine Art Trade Guild
 2007 Best Work on Paper - Birmingham Open. Birmingham Museum and Art Gallery
 2012 Best Painting - West Midlands Open. Wolverhampton Art Gallery / Birmingham Museums

Exhibitions

 2001 Impressions of Birmingham, Halcyon Gallery, Birmingham 
 2002 Streetlife. ICC, Birmingham
 2002 Impressions of London, Harrods, London
 2003 Forward. ICC, Birmingham
 2005 California. Bruton Street, London
 2005 Venice. ICC, Birmingham
 2007 Urban Landscapes. New Bond Street, London
 2007 Birmingham Open. Gas Hall, Birmingham Museum and Art Gallery
 2008 Reuben Colley Exhibition. ICC, Birmingham
 2008 The Art Of Birmingham 1940 to the Millennium. Birmingham Museum and Art Gallery
 2009 Birmingham Seen. Birmingham Museum and Art Gallery
 2010 City of Culture Exhibition in conjunction with Birmingham City Council. RCFA, Birmingham
 2011 Reuben Colley Exhibition. Hay Hill Gallery. Cork Street, Mayfair
 2012 My Birmingham. RCFA, Birmingham
 2013 City Living. RCFA, Birmingham   
 2015 Change In the Inner City, Birmingham Museum and Art Gallery
 2016 City Living Collection II. RCFA, Birmingham
 2017 Remnant (Preview). Bridge Gallery, Birmingham Museum and Art Gallery
 2017 Remnant. RCFA, Birmingham
 2018 Group Exhibition. Birmingham Museum and Art Gallery

Acquisitions

 2002 Council House. Acquired by Birmingham City Council 
 2003 Brindley Light. Acquired by Birmingham Museum and Art Gallery
 2006 Vitol Oil - London. Acquired by Vitol Group
 2011 9:45 Church Street. Acquired by Brown Shipley Private Bank. Birmingham
 2011 Selfridges at Night, Birmingham. Acquired by Selfridges, Birmingham
 2015 John Lewis Birmingham Portfolio. (A collection of five paintings). Acquired by The John Lewis Partnership, John Lewis, Grand Central, Birmingham 
 2018 Birmingham Law Courts. Acquired by The Birmingham Law Society.

References

External links 
 
 Birmingham Living Magazine feature (2013)

1976 births
English artists
People from Birmingham, West Midlands
Living people
Place of birth missing (living people)